Lule River (Luleälven) is a major river in Sweden, rising in northern Sweden and flowing southeast for  before reaching the Gulf of Bothnia at Luleå. It is the second longest river by watershed area or length in Norrbotten County (after the Torne River and very slightly ahead of the Kalix River, which is 460.65 km long), but is the largest by average discharge.

It has a watershed of 25,240.5 km² of which 24,545.6 km² is in Sweden and 694.9 km² in Norway.

The river is an important source of hydroelectric energy, with major hydroelectric plants at e.g. Porjus and the 977 MW Harsprånget, commissioned in 1952 and expanded in 1983 to become Sweden's largest hydro power station.

The river was used extensively for the transportation of timber, with logs floated downstream for processing at Luleå, but this stopped in the early 1980s. Several major rapids exist along the river's length, notably the Stora Falls and those at Porjus and Harsprånget.

During the 19th and 20th centuries, the river was designated as a defensive line against an invasion from Imperial Russia and subsequently the Soviet Union. Extensive fortifications exist along the entire length of the river, culminating in Bodens Fortress in and around the city of Boden. Most of these fortifications and bunkers are no longer in use today.

The Greater Lule River (Big Lule River) arguably begins somewhere near Sårjåsjaure in the mountains west of Gällivare.
The water flows to the Virihaure lake, which also collects water from Kerkevare (via Kettaurejokk) and Alkajaure (via Millätno). The Tukejokk joins the Lule as well in Virihaure. Leaving Virihaure to the north, the river reaches the Vastenjaure lake after losing 32m over 2.2 km.
It then flows via the Vuojatätno to lake Kutjaure and then Luoktanjarkajaure, collecting a lot of water from other lakes in Sarek National Park, like Salohaure, and from the Swedish-Norwegian border.
There are numerous waterfalls and rapids in the river.
The best known is Stora Sjöfallet at the end of the Akkajaure lake, where the water falls 39.6 m from Kårtjejaure to Langasjaure.
In this lake the Vietasajokk joins the Lule.
The Stora Lule träsk is the largest of the lakes in the river.
Here it reaches the forest, and after the lake is joined by the Muddus River from Muddus National Park.
At 75m, near the village of Vuollerim, the river joins with the Lesser Lule River.
The Lule passes the Porsiforsen (25m over 2 km), Edefors and Hedens fors.
It flows into the Baltic Sea through the Bälingefjärden and Lulefjärden.

Other rivers in the watershed of the Lule with a length of more than 100 km are: Black River (Sweden), Flarkån, Lesser Lule River, Pärl River, Rissajåkkå, Vietasätno, and Bodträskån.

References

  article Lule älf from Nordisk Familjebok (1912)

Norrbotten
Lapland (Sweden)

Rivers of Norrbotten County